The Castle of Castellano (Italian: Castello di Castellano) is a manor house built around 1000, in the village of Castellano, in the municipality of Villa Lagarina, in Trentino.

It is one of the most famous castles of Vallagarina, offering a panorama of the entire valley. Owned by numerous  noble families, of which the most important was the Lodron, it was later transformed into an Austrian-Hungarian fortress in World War I.

It once housed frescoes, now preserved in the Civic Museum of Rovereto.

Notes

Buildings and structures completed in the 11th century
Castellano
Museums in Trentino-Alto Adige/Südtirol
Historic house museums in Italy